Events from the year 1784 in Canada.

Incumbents
Monarch: George III

Governors
Governor of the Province of Quebec: Frederick Haldimand
Governor of Nova Scotia: 
Commodore-Governor of Newfoundland: John Byron
Governor of St. John's Island: Walter Patterson

Events
 August 16 -: In response to Loyalist demands, the Crown creates New Brunswick out of Nova Scotia. New Brunswick was then divided into eight counties.
 1784-: North West Company Built up Grand portage as a general summer rendezvous for all companies and free traders, drawing furs from as far as Oregon and the Arctic Circle.
 David Thompson begins apprenticeship on Hudson Bay
 James Cook's journal of his last voyage published in London
 Ward Chipman the Elder, a Massachusetts lawyer, settled in New Brunswick, where he served as solicitor general until 1808.
 Butler's Rangers were disbanded in June 1784, and its veterans were given land grants in the Nassau District, now the Niagara region of Ontario, as a reward for their services to the British Crown.

Births
 June 21: Sir George Arthur, 1st Baronet, army officer and colonial administrator (d.1854)
 October 19: John McLoughlin, physician, fur trader, and merchant (d.1857)

Deaths
 January 28: Henry Allen, evangelist, hymnist, and theologian (b.1748)
 December 13: Dr. Samuel Johnson dies in London. (b.1709)

Full date unknown
 Laurence Coughlan, Methodist preacher, Church of England clergyman, and local official

Historical documents

Lower Canada
Ordinance "for securing the Liberty of the Subject" guarantees habeas corpus rights (with certain limitations) to persons charged with crimes

U.S. exporters to be assessed same duties, drawbacks and bounties on goods shipped to Britain as are on British American exports

Canada is "most prominent [in Empire as] a wide world of Wildernesses" poorly defended, bringing in little revenue and costing perhaps £600,000/yr.

Canada and Nova Scotia will not reach their potential for export to West Indies while they lack population, capital and output of U.S.A.

If it draws "an energy from the war" and encouragement of wheat "manufacturing," Canada will supply Newfoundland and West Indies with flour

Large grist mill available at Pointe-Lévy, with 2 water wheels, 4 pairs of stones, 1,000-bushel bins, plus 16,000-bushel granary being built

Henry Rimphoff successfully sends timber raft up St. Lawrence River from St. Paul's Bay to Quebec City, "chiefly to encourage industry"

Montreal merchant appeals to Continental Congress for compensation of expenditures on U.S. forces and losses from confiscations by Canada

Discharged from Butler's Rangers, Charles Anger entitled to "the portion of Land [in Quebec] alloted to each [Provincial Corps] private soldier"

Loyalists and disbanded troops wishing concessions of land are to muster for settlement from Pointe au Baudet to Cataraqui and at Chaleur Bay

Painting: Loyalists arrived at Johnstown (today's Cornwall, Ont.) on St. Lawrence River

Provincial corps officers who have returned to U.S.A. have had to give up their half-pay, but British government may revoke that rule

Henry Caldwell offers Loyalists about 180,000 acres mostly near Lake Champlain and on Chaudière River near Quebec "on the most reasonable terms"

For sale, "a Stout, healthy, young Panis Girl, about 22 years of age,[...]speaks French and English, and is perfectly honest and sober"

For sale, "a Likely healthy Negro Wench," 15 or 16, brought up in New York, has had smallpox and "understands all sorts of house work"

Black woman's remaining 7-8 years of indenture is for sale; seller assures any purchaser of her "honesty, sobriety and good temper"

Offer of $14 for escaped "Negro-Man named Ishmael," about 36, missing some front teeth and knuckle of one finger, and passes as "a Free Negro"

"A Negro man named Tight" ran away August 12 and was seen crossing St. Lawrence with Snow (another enslaved Black man) about 1st of September

$30 reward for capture of Kamouraska indented apprentice Thomas Costin ("18[,] looks sulky[,] very slovenly and dirty in his dress")

Charles Nishonoit "of the Penobscot tribe was executed on the road side a little out of St. John's Suburbs" for murder of two travellers

Fundraising for treatment of Quebec City's "Sick Poor [who have been] recommended by the Clergy, Magistrates, or other respectable persons"

Practitioner to lecture on theory and practice of midwifery, as it will employ "elderly women" and is needed in Quebec's "infant settlements"

Trois Rivière servant with candle causes loss of entire house by fire (except money, plate and papers saved); 53rd Regiment thanked for saving town

Shoe and boot maker from Edinburgh says "as he is a young beginner," he trusts he will be accepted by public, "particularly his country-men"

Attorney's household effects on auction, including chairs and sofa with curtains and slipcovers "to correspond;" various glassware; cabinetry

"Gentlemen of the Army" and Montreal merchants put on "most elegant and splendid Ball," with dancing 7pm-7am paused for supper at 1am

Pianofortes for sale by Mr. Glackemeyer, who also teaches that instrument and guitar, violin, flute and "Singing French and English"

Poem: "Whence this unusual languor o'er my mind?/This chilling stupor that pervades each sense?/Pensive I sit, each active power confin'd[....]"

Upper Canada
Frederick Haldimand agrees with Joseph Brant that "so fine a Country" as can be purchased on Grand River "is much to be desired"

"The Indians will be greatly surprised[...]when they find that we want to purchase the whole Country"  between three lower Great Lakes

"We have found a place for to setle" - John Deserontyon says Indigenous people have taken spot on Bay of Quinte and need livestock and seeds

Haldimand's instructions for disbanding and settling British forces at Niagara, depending on War Office orders and any evacuation of forts

Evacuating U.S. posts should be delayed while Loyalists are "insulted in the Grossest manner" trying to recover their lost property in U.S.A.

Mississauga chief Pokquan tells John Johnson they are ready to transfer their interlake lands, and welcomes Brant and Six Nations "brethren"

"Affectionate people" - After 7-year absence, minister to Kanien’kéhà:ka preaches to, baptizes and marries them at their New York camp

John Dease takes over Indian Department at Niagara without supplies Indigenous people want ("Tea, Sugar, Barley Rice &c.") or good storage

Dease approves of Joseph Brant going to Fort Stanwix to sound out Americans, advising "that in proper time & place, the Hatchett wou'd be Buried"

U.S. signs peace treaty with Kanien’kéhà:ka, Onondaga, Cayuga and Seneca that draws Six Nations' western boundary just east of Niagara River

Map: Indigenous land ceded to U.S.A. in New York; detail showing 1784 Six Nations allotment

George Pownall says difficulty may arise for settlers from conflicts with Indigenous people and distance from markets (Note: "savages" used)

Joseph Brant is travelling "to the New Settlement at the Grand River" with army engineer and promise of sawmill, grist mill, church and school

"To weaken it as a British province" - James Monroe says Canada will suffer due to resources, geography and, mostly, aggressive U.S. trade

Nova Scotia
House of Assembly, after consulting "principal Merchants and Men of Business" about trade, has passed bills to change system of government revenue

Assembly asks governor to begin prosecution over all irregular public accounts, otherwise "Abuses of public Trust[...]cannot be put a Stop to"

Assembly agrees to let freeholders observe its proceedings, members take notes on debates, and members' names and votes be recorded

Louisbourg will have "proper persons to work the coal mines, which have long been[...]objects of the first consideration [and] of immense value"

Petition to Assembly from Halifax orphanage keeper asking payment for maintaining "Moor Children" since House of Commons stopped support

"Encreasing population, building and improvements[...]really amazing" - 9,000 in Shelburne, more in Carleton and Parrsboro, and "numerous towns begun"

Benjamin Marston details Shelburne's development in housing and fisheries, and Nova Scotia's natural resources and Indigenous people

Gov. Parr makes grant of 98 warehouse lots on waterfront at Shelburne to scores of men for annual quitrent of 1 farthing per lot

Edward Winslow dismayed by distressed Nova Scotians, "vagrants from the streets of London" and "Blackies" begging him for provisions

Black Pioneers' petition for land asks they be granted "Articles Allowed by Government[...]the same as [for] the Rest of the Disbanded Soldiers"

More than 600 names listed as head of family in Muster Book of Free Blacks at Birchtown settlement

Surveyor Benjamin Marston notes disbanded soldiers are rioting in Shelburne against "Free negroes," driving them out and looking for him

"The word came with power to my heart" - Black Loyalist Boston King describes his religious conversion in Birchtown

John Wentworth ships to brother's Suriname estate 19 enslaved Blacks, describing men's skills, and women as likely "to increase their numbers"

"The business we are entering into" - Jamaican instructs his brother to set up in importing (and later perhaps fishing) in Shelburne

After Tea Party "you Said it would coust Newingland Dear, and I think It has old Ingland Two" - pre-war traders renew contact

"[Many] are leaving the bleak province of Nova Scotia for the great advantages in trade that are to be met with at Bermuda"

Hannah Winslow, widow of Edward Winslow Sr., grants power of attorney to Plymouth, Massachusetts lawyer to sell her property in that state

In long letter to his wife, Edward Winslow expresses his love for her and relates story of three condemned men's reprieve at last minute

Edward Winslow notes arriving London women "expose to view such[...]parts as nature seems to intend that every modest woman should conceal"

New Brunswick
New Brunswick to be set up for subjects from "revolted Colonies" and disbanded soldiers, as Halifax too far for them to use its courts

Lord Sidney praised for not assigning civil service jobs to friends, "except those of the Governor and Lieutenant-Governor"

Loyalists to be "victualled" at 2/3 rations (1/3 for kids under 10) in 1784-5, and half that in 1785-6; disbanded soldiers to get full rations

Robert Lawson and 10 other Black Loyalists petition for land promised but not received, fearing "Greatest Distress" to their large families

"Smart, active Negro Boy," about 15, for sale; "title indisputable"

Fort Howe officer seeks "slave" cooper; "speaks English like the West India negroes [and] very talkative;" is from St. Augustine via New York

Nova Scotia Lieutenant Governor Edmund Fanning notes beginning of commerce between Saint John River settlements and West Indies

Settler on "Le Tete Island" praises ice-free and timber-rich Passamaquoddy Bay

New in Carleton are New York watchmaker, Brooklyn tavernkeeper serving some of his old customers, and surgeon with 7 years' army experience

School opened "to teach Youth[...]gauging geometry, trigonometry, navigation, mensuration, surveying, dialing, &c." plus morals and behaviour

Anonymous author seeks 1,000 subscribers for 3-volume "History of the Settlement of his Majesty's Exiled Loyalists," and prints its introduction

Prince Edward Island
Shelburne resident encouraged to come to Charlottetown, where land is "good & easy" to farm and cod fishery "will encrease & rise mens weages"

John MacDonald goes over reasons his charges settling on St. John's Island should be more aware of his sacrifices and good advice for them

MacDonald tells his sister Helen that royal council is impatient with St. John's Island government almost as much as he is with her "Childishness"

Elsewhere
Author experiences (on December 12, 1784) "Nehethawa" moon called "Pou-arch-e-kin-e-shish [or] the wind blowing the brush from the pine tree"

References

 
Canada
84